Olga-Oleksandra Porfyrivna Bazhanska-Ozarkevich (30 December 1866 - 15 July 1906) was a Ukrainian pianist, folklorist, writer, and public figure. Pen names Oksana and Olesya B.

Early life and education 
Olga-Oleksandra Bazhanska was born on December 30, 1866, in Lviv in the family of the Ukrainian Greek Catholic Church priest, composer, musicologist, writer, and folklorist Porfiry Bazhansky.

Bazhanska-Ozarkevych studied music with her father and Ivan Gunevich in Lviv. In 1885, she graduated from the Lviv Teachers' Seminary.

Career

Music 
After the graduation, Bazhanska-Ozarkevych taught to play the piano in the village of Soroky (now Soroky-Lvivski, Pustomytiv district, Lviv region) and in the city of Horodok (now Lviv region).

Bazhanska-Ozarkevych took an active part in the women's movement. In 1891, she became one of the organizers of the "Boyan" musical and choral society in Lviv.

In 1892–1900, Bazhanska-Ozarkevich performed as a pianist in concerts of the "Boyan" society dedicated to Taras Shevchenko and Markiyan Shashkevich. She accompanied the singers Solomiya Krushelnytska (1892, 1894, Oy Lyuli, Lyuli and Oh Moon, Moonlight by Mykola Lysenko, In the Grove, Grove by Denys Sichynskyi), Maria Pavlykiv, Ivan Skalisha, and others at concerts in Lviv.

Bazhanska-Ozarkevich's repertoire included piano works by Ukrainian and foreign composers, including Mykola Lysenko, Frideric Chopin, Ferenc Liszt, and Robert Schumann. According to the definition of the "Encyclopedia of Ukrainian Studies", Olga-Oleksandra Bazhanska is the first Ukrainian professional pianist in Galicia.

Folk songs recorded by Bazhanska-Ozarkevich were included in the collection Rusky-folk Galician melodies (Lviv, 1905–1912, parts 1–10), compiled by Porfiry Bazhansky.

Literary works 
In 1887, Bazhanska-Ozarkevych published the short story Kindrat about the hard fate of a soldier. The same year she published the poem Once Upon a Time in the almanac "Pershiy Vinok".

In 1891, she published the novel 5.V 1891, dedicated to the fate of a female intellectual in the society of that time in the magazine "Narod".

Bazhanska-Ozarkevych translated the works of the Polish writer Władysław Orkan (the stories Evenings, Distrust, Yasna Polyana, Over Bird).

Bazhanska-Ozarkevych died on July 15, 1906, in Zakopane (now Poland). She was buried in Lviv on field 59 of the Lychakiv cemetery.

Personal life 
In 1989 Bazhanska married Longyn Ozarkevich. In 1890 the couple had first their daughter Olga-Oksana. In 1893 Bazhanska-Ozarkevich had her second daughter Natalia who died soon after the birth. In 1895 she gave birth to her son Ivan.

Commemoration 
Composer Ostap Nyzhankivskyi dedicated his work Over the Lake (1894) to Bazhanska-Ozarkevich.

References 

1866 births
1906 deaths
Ukrainian women pianists
Ukrainian folklorists
Women folklorists